Tung Wah is one of the 15 constituencies in the Central and Western District of Hong Kong.

The constituency returns one district councillor to the Central and Western District Council, with an election every four years. The seat was held by Bonnie Ng Hoi-yan of the Democratic Party.

Tung Wah constituency is loosely based on the area around Tung Wah Hospital in Sheung Wan with estimated population of 12,904.

Councillors represented

Election results

2010s

2000s

1990s

Notes

Citations

References
2011 District Council Election Results (Central & Western)
2007 District Council Election Results (Central & Western)
2003 District Council Election Results (Central & Western)
1999 District Council Election Results (Central & Western)
 

Constituencies of Hong Kong
1994 in Hong Kong
1999 in Hong Kong
2003 in Hong Kong
2007 in Hong Kong
2011 in Hong Kong
Constituencies of Central and Western District Council
Constituencies established in 1994
1994 establishments in Hong Kong
Sheung Wan